Athletics competitions at the 2005 South Pacific Mini Games were held at the National Stadium in Koror, Palau, between July 25–29, 2005.

A total of 39 events were contested, 20 by men and 19 by women.

Medal summary
Medal winners and their results were published on the Athletics Weekly webpage
courtesy of Tony Isaacs and Børre Lilloe, and on the Oceania Athletics Association webpage by Bob Snow. Complete results can also be found on the Oceania Athletics Association, the Palau Track and Field Association, and on the Athletics PNG webpages.

Men

Women

Medal table (unofficial)

Participation (unofficial)
The official start list contains 144 athletes (90 men, 54 women) from 17 countries.

 (3)
 (26)
 (9)
 (7)
 (8)
 (15)
 (2)
 (2)
 (13)
 (21)
 (6)
 (16)
 (4)
 (1)
 (4)

Notes
 No medal awarded for place-getters where insufficient competitors took part in an event.

 Host nation Palau had a second-placed athlete and a third-placed athlete, but they were not awarded medals as insufficient competitors took part in those events.

References

External links
Athletics at the 2005 South Pacific Mini Games
Pacific Games Council
Oceania Athletics Association

Athletics at the Pacific Mini Games
Athletics in Palau
South Pacific Mini Games
2005 in Palau
2005 South Pacific Mini Games